Leona Popović (born 13 November 1997) is a Croatian alpine ski racer. Previously, she competed in all disciplines, but now specialises in slalom. Her best World Cup finish is 2nd place in slalom.

Popović's first major competition was the 2015 World Championships in Beaver Creek, USA, where she competed in all disciplines at age seventeen; her best result was 27th in slalom. By her 22nd birthday, she had incurred three surgeries on her left leg. In 2015, she broke her tibia while training slalom, and two surgeries were required in 2018 to fix torn knee ligaments (ACL and MCL) sustained in a crash at the Olympics in the second run of the giant slalom.

World Cup results

Season standings

Race podiums
 0 wins
 1 podium (1 SL); 10 top tens (10 SL)

Results per discipline

World Championship results

Olympic results

References

External links
 
 
 

1997 births
Croatian female alpine skiers
Living people
Sportspeople from Rijeka
Olympic alpine skiers of Croatia
Alpine skiers at the 2018 Winter Olympics
Alpine skiers at the 2022 Winter Olympics